Main-à-Dieu (population 242) is a community located in Nova Scotia's Cape Breton Regional Municipality. It is the most easterly community in Nova Scotia.

It is a fishing village, the homeport for a large lobster fishing fleet, and each spring at the start of lobster fishing season, the local parish priest holds a blessing of the fleet service dockside to pray for the safety of fishermen.

It once had an elementary school, with classes from grades primary to six, but it and several others were combined in 2000 into Riverside Elementary School, and the building has housed the Coastal Discovery Centre since 2004.

The centre includes the Fisherman's Museum, The Big Wave Café and the local library, all of which had previously been housed elsewhere in the community.

Less than half a kilometre from the discovery centre is a sandy beach that stretches along the coast for more than a kilometre.  A boardwalk was constructed along the beach in the mid-1990s.

Notable residents
Michael Forgeron, Olympic rower

References

External links
 Coastal Discovery Centre

General Service Areas in Nova Scotia
Communities in the Cape Breton Regional Municipality